Gozelo, Gotzelo, Gothelo, Gozilo or Goscelo are variant spellings of a masculine given name of Germanic origin. The French form is Gozelon. It was most common in Lotharingia in the Middle Ages. It is a variant of Gozlin, and a diminutive of Godfrey.

Gozelo, Count of Bidgau and Methingau (died 942/3), also known as Gozlin
Gothelo I, Duke of Lorraine (died 1044), nicknamed "the Great"
Gothelo II of Lower Lorraine (died 1046), nicknamed "the Sluggard"
Gozelo I, Count of Montaigu (died 1064), founder of the county of Montaigu
Gozelo II, Count of Montaigu (died 1097), joined the First Crusade

Notes